Richard McDonald (February 1909 – July 14, 1998) and Maurice McDonald (1902 – December 11, 1971), together known as the McDonald Brothers, were American entrepreneurs who founded the fast food company McDonald's. They opened the original McDonald's restaurant in 1940 in San Bernardino, California, where they created the Speedee Service System to produce their meals, a method that would become the standard for fast food. After hiring Ray Kroc as their franchise agent in 1954, they continued to run the company until they were bought out by Kroc in 1961.

Early life
The McDonald brothers were born in Manchester, New Hampshire, to Irish immigrants Patrick and Margarete McDonald, who came to the United States as children. Maurice was born in late 1902, and Richard was born in February 1909. In the 1920s, the family moved to California, where Patrick opened a food stand in Monrovia in 1937.

Careers
In 1948, the brothers fully redesigned and rebuilt their restaurant in San Bernardino to focus on a reduced menu consisting of nine items: In addition to their 15 cent hamburger, the menu would include a cheeseburger, soft drinks, milk, coffee, potato chips, and a slice of pie.

The McDonald brothers' restaurant was a success, and with the goal of making $1 million before they turned 50, the McDonald brothers began franchising their system in 1953, beginning with a restaurant in Phoenix, Arizona, operated by Neil Fox.

The brothers drew the attention of Ray Kroc, a milkshake mixer salesman for Prince Castle. After they purchased eight of his Multi-Mixers for their San Bernardino, California restaurant, Kroc visited that restaurant in 1954. That year the McDonald brothers hired Kroc as their franchise agent. Kroc took 1.9 percent of the gross sales, of which the McDonald brothers got 0.5 percent.

Kroc became frustrated with the McDonald brothers' desire to maintain a small number of restaurants. The brothers also consistently told Kroc he could not make changes to things such as the original blueprint, but despite Kroc's pleas, the brothers never sent any formal letters that legally allowed the changes in the chain. In 1961, Kroc bought the company for $2.7 million, calculated so as to ensure each brother received $1 million after taxes.

At the closing, Kroc became annoyed that the brothers would not transfer to him the real estate and rights to the original San Bernardino location. The brothers had told Kroc they were giving the operation, property and all, to the founding employees. In his anger, Kroc later opened a new McDonald's restaurant near the original McDonald's, which had been renamed "The Big M" because the brothers had neglected to retain rights to the name. "The Big M" closed six years later. It is alleged that as part of the buyout Kroc promised, based on a handshake agreement, to continue the annual 1% royalty of the original agreement, but there is no evidence of this beyond a claim by a nephew of the McDonald brothers. Neither of the brothers publicly expressed disappointment over the deal. Speaking to someone about the buyout, Richard McDonald reportedly said that he had no regrets.

On November 30, 1984, Richard McDonald, the first cook behind the grill of a McDonald's, was served the ceremonial 50 billionth McDonald's hamburger by Ed Rensi, then-president of McDonald's USA, at the Grand Hyatt hotel in New York City.

Death and legacy
Maurice McDonald died from heart failure at his home in Palm Springs, California, on December 11, 1971, at the age of 69. 

Richard McDonald also died from heart failure in a nursing home in Manchester, New Hampshire, on July 14, 1998, at the age of 89. He was buried at the Mount Calvary Cemetery in Manchester.

In the 2016 film The Founder, a biopic about Ray Kroc and his business relationship with the McDonald brothers, Richard (Dick) McDonald is played by Nick Offerman, and John Carroll Lynch portrays Maurice (Mac) McDonald.

The first McDonald's, according to the California Route 66 Association, is owned by Albert Okura and is a museum.

References

External links
 
 
 

1902 births
1909 births
1971 deaths
1998 deaths
American people of Scottish descent
Business duos
Fast-food chain founders
McDonald's people
People from Manchester, New Hampshire
Sibling duos
Burials at Desert Memorial Park